Obra Assembly constituency may refer to 
 Obra, Bihar Assembly constituency
 Obra, Uttar Pradesh Assembly constituency